K Nandasena Perera (29 August 1954 – 14 February 2019) was a Sri Lankan professional golfer.

Early life
Perera grew up in Colombo, Sri Lanka. Perera left school early to work for his family. He later got into golf while working as a caddy at the Royal Colombo Golf Club. Despite this he went on to be a professional golfer.

Golf career
Perera shot a 63 (−8) at the Royal Colombo Golf Course Open in 1983, breaking the course record. He would go on to win the event. Very shortly afterwards he played in the Singapore Open. In the second round he made a hole-in-one winning a free Mercedes-Benz E320.

Perera's competed at the 1990 Asian Games in Beijing, China. Perera was in the finals against Japan's Shigeki Maruyama. The two were tied after regulation and competed in a sudden-death playoff to determine who got the gold medal. Maruyama hit his drive into the rough and could not find his ball after three minutes of searching. If two more minutes elapsed then he would have to take a penalty stroke. However, Perera found the ball and notified his competitor. Maruyama went on to defeat Perera on that hole. Perera, however, won a Silver Medal and was remembered for his act of sportsmanship.

In 1991, Perera played excellently at several international tournaments. He won the 1991 Sabah Masters, an event played in Indonesia. A couple months later, in October 1991, he finished runner-up at the Malaysian Masters to Australian Stewart Ginn. His best play that year, however, may have been at that November's Air New Zealand Shell Open. Ten behind entering Sunday, Perera shot a final round 66 (−4) in "wet, windy conditions" to "surge through the pack" and finish solo second. The following year, Perera also recorded a number of top ten finishes on the international circuit. The best finish was a joint runner-up placing at the Benson & Hedges Malaysian Open to Vijay Singh.

Perera soon qualified for the Japan Golf Tour and Asian Tour. However, the colder conditions in Japan affected him and he developed severe arthritis. This led to end of his career as a touring professional.

The Indian golfer Rishi Narain noted that Perera was probably the best South Asian golfer of his era.

Personal life
Perera was married to Ranjani. He had three children: a daughter, Nithini, who is a doctor in India; a son, Mithun, who is a professional golfer; and another daughter, Michiko, an archaeology student at University of Colombo. Mithum has won seven events on the Professional Golf Tour of India and has recorded three runner-up finishes on the Asian Tour.

Late in the life, Perera was granted a plot of land adjacent to Royal Colombo Golf Course. He built a house there with the help of several members of the club.

Perera died in early 2019. Late in the year, his son Mithun won an event on the Professional Golf Tour of India and dedicated the win to his father.

Amateur wins
1983 Royal Colombo Golf Course Open
1988 Sri Lanka National Amateur Golf Championship, Amateur Golf Championship of India
1989 Sri Lanka National Amateur Golf Championship, All India Amateur Golf Championship
1990 Sri Lanka National Amateur Golf Championship, All India Amateur Golf Championship
Pakistan Amateur Golf Championship
Thailand Amateur Golf Championship
Singapore Amateur Golf Championship
Malaysia Amateur Golf Championship

Professional wins
1991 Sabah Masters
Sri Lankan National Open (7 times)

Team appearances
Asian Games (representing Sri Lanka): 1990 (individual silver medal)
World Cup of Golf (representing Sri Lanka): 1996

References

External links

Sri Lankan male golfers
Asian Games medalists in golf
Asian Games silver medalists for Sri Lanka
Golfers at the 1990 Asian Games
Medalists at the 1990 Asian Games
2019 deaths
Date of birth uncertain